Zhao Yue (English: Akira Zhao, born April 29, 1995 in Wuhan, Hubei, China) is a Chinese idol singer. She was a member of Team NII of Chinese idol group SNH48, and its sub-unit 7Senses, she graduated from the group on September 11, 2022. She was also a member of Chinese girl group BonBon Girls 303 after finishing second in the reality show Produce Camp 2020, the group disbanded on July 4, 2022.

Career
On 18 August 2013, Zhao was among the 34 shortlisted candidates for second-generation members of SNH48, and was promoted to Team NII on 11 November. On 16 November, she participated in SNH48's first major concert, "SNH48 Guangzhou Concert", held in the Guangzhou International Sports Arena.

On 18 January 2014, Zhao participated in SNH48's Red and White Concert.

On 31 January 2015, Zhao performed at the Request Hour Setlist Best 30 2015 Concert, of which her performance of "Itoshisa no Accel" was ranked 5th. On 25 July, during SNH48's second General Election, she was ranked 11th with 25,245 votes. On 1 October, she starred in Balala the Fairies: Princess Camellia.

On 20 April 2016, Zhao was announced as one of the members of SNH48's sub-unit, 7SENSES. On 19 June, she participated in the filming of Heroes of Remix. On 30 July, Zhao Yue was ranked ninth with 47,563.5 votes during SNH48's third General Election.

On 7 January 2017, she participated in SNH48's third Request Time, of which her song "Don't Touch", performed with Ju Jingyi and Zeng Yanfen, came in first. On 7 April 2017, as the lead dancer of 7SENSES, Zhao and the other members of 7SENSES made their debut showcase in Shanghai and released their first EP Seven Sen7es. On 1 May 2017, Zhao starred in TV drama Judo High. On 29 July 2017, Zhao was ranked 7th with 90,929.7 votes during SNH48's fourth General Election. On 5 November 2017, Zhao won the Best Star Award with 7SENSES in 2nd Asia Artist Awards.

On 28 July 2018, Zhao was ranked 6th with 100,522.08 votes during SNH48's fifth General Election.

Zhao did not participate in the finals of SNH48's sixth General Election in 2019.

In 2020, Zhao joined Chinese competition variety show series Produce Camp 2020 (also known as Chuang 2020) as a contestant. In the finale aired on 4 July 2020, Zhao finished in 2nd place, securing her place in the debut group BonBon Girls 303.

Discography

Singles

SNH48 Activities

EPs

With 7SENSES
 Seven Sen7es (April 7, 2017)
 Chapter: Blooming (November 20, 2017)
 Swan (December 12, 2018)
 New Plan (November 4, 2019)
 Crazy For You (January 9, 2022)

Albums
 Mae Shika Mukanee (2014)

Units

SNH48 Stage Units

Concert units

Filmography

Television films

Television series

Variety shows

Notes

References

External links
 Official Member Profile  
 
 

1995 births
Living people
SNH48 members
BonBon Girls 303 members
Actresses from Wuhan
Actresses from Hubei
Chinese Mandopop singers
Chinese film actresses
Chinese television actresses
21st-century Chinese actresses
Singers from Hubei
Japanese-language singers
Korean-language singers of China
Produce 101 (Chinese TV series) contestants
Reality show winners